The Song of the Canary is a 1978 American occupational health documentary film directed by Josh Hanig and David Davis. The film documents the Occidental Petroleum plant in Manteca, California and the scandal in which employees became sterile after being exposed to the pesticide DBCP. It also features interviews with workers over the use of guinea pigs, and health and safety regulations. The soundtrack, composed by Doug McKechnie, features the song "Like It Is" by Yusef Lateef.

Won Blue Ribbon Award at the American Film Festival in New York City in 1979

Plot

Cast

References

1978 films
1978 documentary films
American documentary films
Films about industries
1970s American films